Kate Kelly may refer to:

 Kate Kelly (politician), Idaho State Senator
 Kate Kelly (outlaw) (1863–1898), sister of outlaw Ned Kelly
 Kate Kelly (sculptor) (1882–1964), American-Hawaiian sculptor
 Kate Kelly (camogie), Wexford camogie player
 Kate Kelly (shipwreck), a sunken schooner off the coast of Wind Point, Wisconsin
 Kate Kelly (feminist) (born 1980), Washington, D.C. lawyer, and founder of Ordain Women
 Kate Kelly (journalist), American journalist

See also 
 Katherine Kelly (disambiguation)

Kelly, Kate